João Maria Cordovil (born 23 April 1946) is a Portuguese chess FIDE master (FM), International Correspondence Chess Master (IM), three-times Portuguese Chess Championships winner (1966, 1967, 1969).

Biography
In the 1960s and 1970s João Maria Cordovil was one of Portugal's leading chess players. He three times won Portuguese Chess Championship: 1966, 1967, and 1969. João Maria Cordovil twice participated in World Junior Chess Championship (1963, 1965) and once in World Chess Championship Zonal tournament (1969).

João Maria Cordovil played for Portugal in the Chess Olympiads:
 In 1964, at second reserve board in the 16th Chess Olympiad in Tel Aviv (+0, =0, -3),
 In 1966, at third board in the 17th Chess Olympiad in Havana (+4, =5, -7),
 In 1968, at first board in the 18th Chess Olympiad in Lugano (+3, =7, -8),
 In 1970, at first board in the 19th Chess Olympiad in Siegen (+7, =3, -8),
 In 1974, at third board in the 21st Chess Olympiad in Nice (+7, =1, -9),
 In 1984, at second reserve board in the 26th Chess Olympiad in Thessaloniki (+3, =2, -1).

João Maria Cordovil played for Portugal in the European Team Chess Championship:
 In 1989, at second reserve board in the 9th European Team Chess Championship in Haifa (+0, =0, -1).

In later years, João Maria Cordovil active participated in correspondence chess tournaments. He participated in 14th World Correspondence Chess Championship (1994-2000). In 1991, João Maria Cordovil was awarded the ICCF International Correspondence Chess Master (IM) title.

References

External links

João Maria Cordovil chess games at 365chess.com

1946 births
Living people
Chess FIDE Masters
Portuguese chess players
Chess Olympiad competitors
20th-century chess players